George D. Belotti (November 29, 1934 – June 15, 2009) was an American football offensive lineman.  A center, he played college football at the University of Southern California, and played professionally in the American Football League for the Houston Oilers in 1960 and 1961, and for the San Diego Chargers in 1961. He died of complications from a stroke.

See also

List of American Football League players

References

External links

1934 births
2009 deaths
Players of American football from Los Angeles
American football centers
USC Trojans football players
Houston Oilers players
San Diego Chargers players
American Football League players